John Varick Tunney (June 26, 1934 – January 12, 2018) was an American politician who served as a United States Senator and Representative from the state of California in the 1960s and 1970s.

He was the son of boxing champion Gene Tunney.

Early life and career
Tunney was born in New York City, the son of heavyweight boxing champion J. Joseph Tunney, widely known as "Gene", and Polly Lauder Tunney, a member of the Lauder Greenway Family. He grew up on the family's Star Meadow Farm in Stamford, Connecticut and attended New Canaan Country School and the Westminster School.

Tunney graduated from Yale University in 1956 with a degree in anthropology, where he was a member of the St. Anthony Hall fraternity. He attended The Hague Academy of International Law in the Netherlands and graduated from the University of Virginia School of Law in 1959, where he was a roommate of future Massachusetts senator Ted Kennedy, who remained a close friend. Tunney was admitted to the Virginia and New York bars in 1959 and practiced law in New York City. He married his first wife, Mieke Sprengers, on February 5, 1959.

Tunney joined the United States Air Force as a judge advocate and served until he was discharged as a captain in April 1963. He taught business law at the University of California, Riverside in 1961 and 1962. In 1963, he was admitted to practice law in California. He was a special adviser to the President's Committee on Juvenile Delinquency and Youth Crime from 1963 until 1968.

In 1964, Tunney was elected as a Democrat in the United States House of Representatives from California's 38th congressional district (Riverside and Imperial counties). He served from January 3, 1965, until his resignation on January 2, 1971, when he became a senator.

In July 1969, while serving as a congressman, Tunney was called to Hyannisport, Massachusetts by Senator Kennedy, a friend and former college roommate, to assist in dealing with the death of Mary Jo Kopechne following the Chappaquiddick incident. Noting his "service to the state," Tunney was made an honorary member of Phi Sigma Kappa by the fraternity's Cal State Northridge chapter in 1970.

United States Senator
In early 1970, Representative Tunney announced that he would seek the Democratic nomination for the Senate. His announcement was followed by that of fellow congressman George Brown, Jr. Their primary battle turned into one of the most bitter in California history. One of the key issues was the military draft. While Brown and Tunney both questioned expanding U.S. involvement in Vietnam, Brown opposed a continuation of the military draft while Tunney favored it. This conflict gave incumbent Republican George Murphy an early lead in the polls. Murphy's staunch support for the Vietnam War hurt his campaign and as the general election approached, Tunney overtook him in the polls. The Murphy campaign suffered another setback when he underwent surgery for throat cancer, weakening his voice to a whisper. The Tunney campaign used his youthful appearance and high energy to contrast with the aging Murphy. His hairstyle and mannerisms drew comparisons to Robert F. Kennedy. Ultimately, Californians split their ticket in the 1970 midterm election, re-electing Republican governor Ronald Reagan and electing Democrat Tunney to the Senate.

During his Senate term, Tunney produced a weekly radio report to California, in which he often interviewed other legislators. In 1974, he authored an antitrust bill known as the Tunney Act. Tunney would later write a book, The Changing Dream, about what he saw as a looming resource crisis.

In December 1975, Tunney advocated for using American diplomacy in dealing with the Angolan Civil War. American covert and military support for pro-US rebels there suggested a return to the policies that had led up toward the highly unpopular Vietnam War. The Senate had postponed passage of the annual defense budget because of concerns that the bill contained funds for covert operations against Soviet-backed Angolan rebels. The CIA conducted highly classified briefings for senators, including Tunney, providing an accounting of where money was being spent. However, they failed to persuade him of the policy's usefulness. It was at this time that Tunney introduced an amendment that would cut $33 million from the defense budget that was to be allocated to pro-US rebels for covert operations. That effectively ended current and future covert funding from defense appropriations for Angola. Aid supporters filibustered the cutoff, offered counter-amendments and tried to shelve the amendment in committee.

The Ford administration, which strongly supported the covert operations, asserted that the amendment was a threat to both US-Soviet and US-Cuban relations. Cuba had deployed combat troops to Angola a month earlier. On December 20, 1975, Tunney's amendment passed 54–22 with the support of 16 Republicans. Its passage also increased the power of the Congress in foreign affairs at the expense of the executive branch.

Tunney was renominated for a second term in 1976 despite a high-profile challenge from his left in the form of Tom Hayden. That fall, Tunney was defeated in his reelection bid by Republican S. I. Hayakawa, the former president of San Francisco State University, who had never held elected office. Hayakawa ran as an outsider and highlighted Tunney's numerous travels, missed Senate votes, and poor Senate attendance record during the campaign. He also painted Tunney as a flip-flopper.

Still, Tunney led in the polls right up to election night, despite a steadily shrinking lead as the campaign wore on. Despite Democrat Jimmy Carter's victory in the presidential election, Tunney lost to Hayakawa in a mild upset, though Republican Gerald Ford carried California in the presidential election. Tunney resigned his Senate seat on January 1, 1977, two days before his term would officially expire, to allow Hayakawa to have seniority over other incoming senators.

Throughout Tunney's term as a senator, he served as California's junior senator and served with Alan Cranston.

After his 1976 Senate defeat, Tunney resumed practicing law and was a named partner at Manatt, Phelps, Rothenberg & Tunney (1976–1987). He also served on several corporate boards.

Interest in constitutional rights and government surveillance
In early 1975, soon after becoming chairman of the Senate Judiciary Subcommittee on Constitutional Rights, Tunney asked the subcommittee staff to initiate a long-term comprehensive investigation into the technological aspects of surveillance. The Surveillance Technology Report of 1976 stated that "This investigation of surveillance was the first attempt to organize an immense amount of data in a comprehensive and usable format and to provide a framework for future analyses and, ultimately, for the creation of institutional mechanisms that will diminish the threats posted by surveillance technology." In the preface of the report Tunney stated, "If knowledge is power, then certainly the secret and unlimited acquisition of the most detailed knowledge about the most intimate aspects of a person's thoughts and actions conveys extraordinary power over that person's life and reputation to the snooper who possesses the highly personal information."

Tunney also served as chairman of the Commerce Subcommittee on Science and Technology, and as a member of the Joint Atomic Energy Committee.

Personal life
On May 22, 1972, Tunney's Dutch-born wife Mieke sued for dissolution of their 13-year marriage on the basis of irreconcilable differences. In addition to alimony, child support and half of the community property, she requested custody of the couple's three children.

On April 23, 1977, Tunney married Kathinka Osborne, a member of the 1964 Swedish Olympic ski team, with longtime friend Senator Kennedy serving as the best man.

In February 2003, Tunney joined former Senate colleagues George McGovern and Fred Harris in opposing the Iraq War.

John and Kathinka Tunney lived primarily in Sun Valley, Idaho (with homes also in New York and Los Angeles). He was chairman of the board of the Armand Hammer Museum of Art and Culture Center at UCLA and remained active in environmental causes. Tunney retired from the Hammer Museum board at the end of 2013. In February 2015, a pedestrian bridge at the museum designed by architect Michael Maltzan was named in Tunney's honor.

Writer Jeremy Larner and director Michael Ritchie reportedly based the 1972 film The Candidate, starring Robert Redford, on Tunney's successful Senate race in 1970.

In The Ted Kennedy Jr. Story, a 1986 NBC-TV movie based on Ted Kennedy Jr. losing one of his legs to cancer, Tunney was portrayed by Michael J. Shannon.

Tunney died of prostate cancer on January 12, 2018, in Santa Monica, California, at the age of 83.

See also
 List of United States senators from California

References

External links
 Former U.S. Senator John V. Tunney
 Biographical Directory of the United States Congress entry

|-

|-

|-

1934 births
2018 deaths
Lauder Greenway Family
Deaths from prostate cancer
Deaths from cancer in California
Democratic Party United States senators from California
The Hague Academy of International Law people
Democratic Party members of the United States House of Representatives from California
Military personnel from New York City
Politicians from New York City
University of California, Riverside faculty
University of Virginia School of Law alumni
Yale University alumni